Mount Duke is a  mountain summit located in the Joffre Group of the Lillooet Ranges, in southwestern British Columbia, Canada. The highest peak in the Joffre Group, Mount Matier, rises  to the west. The mountain's name was submitted by Reverend Damasus Payne, a Benedictine monk and mountaineer, to honor Archbishop William Mark Duke. It was officially adopted on April 21, 1966, by the Geographical Names Board of Canada. Precipitation runoff from the peak drains into Caspar Creek and Twin One Creek.

Climate

Based on the Köppen climate classification, Mount Duke is located in a subarctic climate zone of western North America. Most weather fronts originate in the Pacific Ocean, and travel east toward the Coast Mountains where they are forced upward by the range (Orographic lift), causing them to drop their moisture in the form of rain or snowfall. As a result, the Coast Mountains experience high precipitation, especially during the winter months in the form of snowfall. Temperatures can drop below −20 °C with wind chill factors below −30 °C. The months July through September offer the most favorable weather for climbing Mount Duke.

See also

 Geography of British Columbia
 Geology of British Columbia

References

External links
 Weather Forecast: Mount Duke

Two-thousanders of British Columbia
Pacific Ranges
Lillooet Land District